Pittis is a surname. Notable people with the surname include:

 Domenic Pittis (born 1974), Canadian ice hockey player
 Florian Pittiş (1943–2007), Romanian actor, theatre director, singer, and radio producer
 Riccardo Pittis (born 1968), Italian basketball player

See also
 Pettis (surname)